Ayudha katti (also written ayda katti or aydha katti or आयुध कटि) is an indigenous weapon of war and tools to the Kodava people of Kodagu, in the state of Karnataka, India. The ayudha katti is developed from an implement used to cut through dense undergrowth. Unlike most blades, the ayudha katti is worn without a sheath.

Origin
The ayudha katti is the traditional sword of the Kodavas  The Kodavas inhabit the region of Kodagu in southwestern India in what is now the state of Karnataka. The Kodavas have resided in the area for over 2 millennia cultivating paddy fields, maintaining cattle herds and carrying arms during war. The invention of the ayudha katti probably started around the 17th-century. It was first invented as an implement used to cut through dense undergrowth. The shape of the blade is similar with the Turkish yatagan and northern Indian sosun pattah, which indicates that it is related to the Ancient Greek kopis blade.

During the colonial period, the British named the region "Coorg", a corruption of the Kannada word "kodaga" or "kodagu" meaning "hilly, steep". The word refers to the geographical condition of the region.

Description

The length of the ayudha katti varies greatly. There are two known forms of the ayudha katti. The 'war' form is mainly used for melee combat, and the 'prestige' form is worn for daily use. Unlike the prestige form, the war ayudha katti lacks the egg-shaped pommel plate on the base of the hilt. The ayudha katti is one of the rarest of the edged- weapons.

The sharpened edge is located on the concave side of the blade. The top (the non-sharpened edge) of the sword is initially concave, then it tapers slightly for about a quarter of the length until it becomes extremely convex, and then it tapers quickly until the point. The overall shape of ayudha katti is short and quite heavy. The shape somehow resembles the moplah sword used by the Muslim population on the Malabar Coast, although unlike the moplah, the ayudha katti is sharpened only on one side and has no medial ridge. Ayudha katti is mostly a chopping tool, a very common weapon found worldwide. It was used for clearing the forest, as an agricultural tool, as well as melee weapon in war.

The hilt of the ayudha katti can be made of wood or horn (usually of the water buffalo). The pommel is a plate with the shape if an egg and is made of same material as the hilt. The hilt is often decorated with traditional geometric or floral carvings.

Ayudha katti is peculiarly worn without a scabbard. It is typically held in the hand while sitting. Prestige form ayudha katti has a special carrying device consisting of a silver chain that serves as a belt and a large brass ring for hanging the knife in the back of the blade's holder.

See also

 Moplah (similar, but with different hilt shape)
 Golok
 Pichangatti

References

Cited works 

 

Indian swords
South Asian swords
Single-edged swords
Swords